Cargo is the second studio album by the Australian pop rock band Men at Work, which was released in April 1983. It peaked at No. 1 on the Australian Kent Music Report Albums Chart, No. 2 in New Zealand, No. 3 on the United States Billboard 200, and No. 8 on the United Kingdom Albums Chart. Four singles were released from the album, with "Overkill" being an international top 10 hit in Canada, Ireland, Norway, and US Billboard Hot 100. This was the final Men at Work album to feature the original lineup.

Background 

Australian pop rock group, Men at Work, released their second album, Cargo, in April 1983, which peaked at No. 1 – for two weeks – on the Australian Kent Music Report Albums Chart. In New Zealand it reached No. 2. The album was recorded and finished by mid-1982 with Peter McIan producing again, but its release was pushed back due to the continued success of their debut album, Business as Usual. On the international market, where Business as Usual was still riding high, Cargo appeared at No. 3 on the Billboard 200, and No. 8 in the UK. The lead single, "Dr. Heckyll & Mr. Jive", was issued in Australia, ahead of the album, in October 1982; it reached No. 6 there in late 1982 and peaked at No. 28 in the US the following year. The second single "Overkill" was released in March 1983 and made it to No. 5 in Australia, and No. 3 in the US. A third single "It's a Mistake" followed in June and only reached No. 34 in Australia, but it did peak at No. 6 in the US. The much less successful fourth and final single "High Wire" was released in late 1983 and only reached No. 89 in Australia, but did reach No. 23 on the US Hot Mainstream Rock Tracks. The band toured the world extensively in 1983.

Reception 

In Smash Hits, Fred Dellar praised Cargo as "an immaculately constructed album of outback pop for in-front people". Rolling Stones Christopher Connelly wrote that Cargo "may lack a track with the body-slamming intensity of 'Who Can It Be Now?' and 'Down Under', but song for song, it is a stronger overall effort than Business as Usual". He chiefly praised the album's dark, paranoid lyrics. John Mendelssohn of Record also felt that none of the tracks measured up to Men at Work's early hits, but went further, saying the album in its entirety is inoffensive but forgettable, with "Upstairs in My House" being the only highlight. He found the band's instrumental solos particularly dull, and assessed that Men at Work's one asset is that "Colin Hay may be the most effortlessly soulful pop singer since Sting".

In a retrospective review, AllMusic's Stephen Thomas Erlewine praised "Overkill" and "It's a Mistake" as "demonstrating more depth than anything on the debut". However, he asserted that the album parallels their debut in that it focuses on two strong singles while it is "weighed down by filler".

Track listing 

The live tracks on the 2003 Remastered edition are from a concert recorded 28 July 1983 at Merriweather Post Pavilion, Columbia, MD (13, 14) and from a 1983 concert in Berkeley, CA (15).

Personnel 
Men at Work
 Colin Hay – lead vocals (except on tracks 3 and 9), guitar, background vocals
 Greg Ham – flute, keyboards, saxophone, harmonica, background vocals, lead vocals on track 9
 Ron Strykert – guitar, background vocals, lead vocals on track 3
 John Rees – bass, background vocals
 Jerry Speiser – drums, background vocals
Production
 Peter McIan – production, engineer
 Paul Ray – engineer
 David Price – assistant engineer
 Greg Noakes – photography
 Ron Strykert – artwork
 Nathan D. Brenner – international manager

Charts

Weekly charts

Year-end charts

Certifications

References 

1983 albums
Men at Work albums
Columbia Records albums